Bexley London Borough Council is the local authority for the London Borough of Bexley in London, England. The council is elected every four years.

Political control
The first elections to the council were held in 1964, initially operating as a shadow authority until the new system came into effect the following year. Political control of the council since 1964 has been held by the following parties:

Leadership
The leaders of the council since 1965 have been:

Council elections
 1964 Bexley London Borough Council election
 1968 Bexley London Borough Council election
 1971 Bexley London Borough Council election
 1974 Bexley London Borough Council election (boundary changes increased the number of seats by three)
 1978 Bexley London Borough Council election (boundary changes increased the number of seats by three)
 1982 Bexley London Borough Council election
 1986 Bexley London Borough Council election
 1990 Bexley London Borough Council election
 1994 Bexley London Borough Council election (boundary changes took place but the number of seats remained the same)
 1998 Bexley London Borough Council election
 2002 Bexley London Borough Council election (boundary changes increased the number of seats by one) 
 2006 Bexley London Borough Council election
 2010 Bexley London Borough Council election
 2014 Bexley London Borough Council election
 2018 Bexley London Borough Council election
 2022 Bexley London Borough Council election

Borough result maps

By-election results

1964–1968
There were no by-elections.

1968–1971

1971–1974

1974–1978

1978–1982

1982–1986

1986–1990

1990–1994

The by-election was called following the resignation of Cllr. Keith A. Le Pia. 

The by-election was called following the death of Cllr. Brian A. Sams.

1994–1998

The by-election was called following the death of Cllr. Ann F. Wheelock.

The by-election was called following the death of Cllr. Frank J. Barratt. 

The by-election was called following the resignation of Cllr. Valentine A. M. Morgan. 

The by-election was called following the death of Cllr. Margaret E. Flint.

1998–2002
Blendon & Penhill, 25 June 1998, was not a by-election, but a postponed election from May 1998 due to the death of a nominated candidate.

The by-election was called following the death of Cllr. David N. Ives.

The by-election was called following the resignation of Cllr. Doreen A. Cameron.

2002–2006
There were no by-elections.

2006–2010

The by-election was called following the resignation of Cllr. Ian S. Clement.

The by-election was called following the death of Cllr. Alfred W. Catterall.

2010–2014
There were no by-elections.

2014–2018

2018–2022

References

Bexley election results
By-election results

External links
Bexley Council

Politics of the London Borough of Bexley